Trichonida may refer to:

Lake Trichonida, a lake in western Greece
Trichonida Province, a former province in western Greece